Tarim District is a district of the Hadhramaut Governorate, Yemen. As of 2003, the district had a population of 100,617 inhabitants with Tarim as its biggest city.

References

Districts of Hadhramaut Governorate